Rockwell International was a major American manufacturing conglomerate involved in aircraft, the space industry, defense and commercial electronics, components in the automotive industry, printing presses, avionics and industrial products. Rockwell International's predecessor was Rockwell Manufacturing Company, founded in 1919 by Willard Rockwell. In 1968, Rockwell Manufacturing Company included 7 operating divisions manufacturing industrial valves, German 2-cycle motors, power tools, gas and water meters. In 1973, it was combined with the aerospace products and renamed Rockwell International. At its peak, Rockwell International was No. 27 on the Fortune 500 list, with assets of over $8 billion, sales of $27 billion and 115,000 employees.

History

Rockwell Manufacturing Company 

Boston-born Willard Rockwell (1888–1978) made his fortune with the invention and successful launch of a new bearing system for truck axles in 1919. He merged his Oshkosh, Wisconsin-based operation with the Timken-Detroit Axle Company (current Meritor Inc.) in 1928, rising to become chairman of its board in 1940.

In 1945, Rockwell Manufacturing Company acquired Delta Machinery and renamed it the Delta Power Tool Division of Rockwell Manufacturing Company and continued to manufacture in Milwaukee. In 1966, Rockwell invented the world's first power miter saw. In 1981, Rockwell's power tool group was acquired by Pentair and re-branded Delta Machinery. Pentair's Tools group was acquired by Black & Decker in 2005. Since 1994, Rockwell power tools are now manufactured by Positec Tool Corporation

In 1956, Rockwell Manufacturing Co. bought Walker-Turner from Kearney and Trecker. In 1957, Walker-Turner operations were closed down in Plainfield, New Jersey and moved to Bellefontaine, Ohio and Tupelo, Mississippi.

Timken-Detroit merged in 1953 with the Standard Steel Spring Company, forming the Rockwell Spring and Axle Company. After various mergers with automotive suppliers, it comprised about 10 to 20 factories in the Upper Midwestern U.S. and southern Ontario, and in 1958 renamed itself Rockwell-Standard Corporation.

Pittsburgh-based Rockwell Standard then acquired and merged with Los Angeles-based North American Aviation to form North American Rockwell in September 1967. It then purchased Miehle-Goss-Dexter, the largest supplier of printing presses, and in 1973, acquired Collins Radio, a major avionics supplier.

In 1968, Sterling Faucet Company was bought by Rockwell Manufacturing Co. and it became a subsidiary of the company.

1968–1974 
Michael W. Hodges (who had also served as Corporate Director Manufacturing and later as CEO and 'Geschäftsführer' (Managing Director) of the German-based Engine Division) joined Rockwell Manufacturing Company in 1968 as Corporate Director Quality Assurance. He was appointed member of the Board of Directors of Rockwell GMBH Germany and Dikkers Valve Products LLC Netherlands. Prior to Rockwell, Michael Hodges was a physicist with NASA and aerospace management with Martin-Marietta Corp. in Orlando, Fl. 

During Hodges' seven years with Rockwell there were approximately 90,000 employees in seven divisions: the Valve Division with products for the gas and oil industry with plants located in Barberton, Ohio, Raleigh, NC, Sulfur Springs, Tx., and Kearney, Nebraska, the Gas Products Division of meters and regulators in Dubois, Pa, the Municipal Water Meter Division in Uniontown, Pa., the Power Tool Division in Syracuse, NY, Jackson, Tenn., Tupelo, Miss., and Columbia, SC, the Transportation Division in Atchison, Kansas with a large steel foundry of products for the automotive, railway and rapid-transit industry, the Sterling Faucet Division in Reedsville, WV, and the Engine Division in Pinneberg, Germany (previously ILO-Motorenwerke, founded 1911 and acquired by Rockwell in 1959), manufacturing 2-cycle gas-driven motors for developing nation products including motor tillers, water pumps, sprayers, cement mixers, tampers and mopeds as well as snowmobile- and all-terrain vehicle engines for North America. 

A significantly different direction was planned starting in 1973 away from the business model developed since 1945 by the founder Willard Rockwell (1888–1978). The founder's son, Willard Rockwell Jr., appeared taking the company in a new direction, replacing the founder's model of strong medium-size manufacturing companies with diverse industrial products with strong industrial engineering and quality control in multiple locations – to a new model leveraging assets of the profitable seven manufacturing divisions of Rockwell Manufacturing Company into a new business model of a dominant government-serving (NASA, Defense Dept.) aerospace company, named Rockwell International, which included North American Aviation, of products such as the Space Shuttle. By the end of the 1980s, Rockwell International began to sell-off its prior industrial product manufacturing divisions, starting with the Valve Division, leading to the sale of all divisions and the end of the Rockwell names > Rockwell Manufacturing Company, North American Rockwell, and Rockwell International

In 1973, North American Rockwell merged with Rockwell Manufacturing, run by Willard Rockwell Jr., to form Rockwell International. In the same year, the company acquired Admiral Radio and TV for US$500 million. In 1979, the appliance division was sold to Magic Chef.

Rockwell International also drew on the strengths of several of George Westinghouse's concerns, and Westinghouse is considered a co-founder of the company.

Apex and break-up 
In 1978, Rockwell released AIM-65, a one board microprocessor development board based on the MOS Technology 6502. With the death of company founder and first CEO Willard F. Rockwell in 1978, and the stepping down of his son Willard Rockwell Jr. in 1979 as the second CEO, Bob Anderson became CEO and led the company through the 1980s when it became the largest U.S. defense contractor and largest NASA contractor. Rockwell acquired the privately held Allen-Bradley Company for US$1.6 billion in February 1985 – US$1 billion of which was cash – and became a producer of industrial automation hardware and software.

During the 1980s, Anderson, his CFO Bob dePalma, and the Rockwell management team built the company to #27 on the Fortune 500 list. It boasted sales of US$12 billion, roughly US$32 billion in 2019, and assets of over US$8 billion, roughly US$21 billion in 2019. Its workforce of over 115,000 was organized into nine major divisions – Space, Aircraft, Defense Electronics, Commercial Electronics, Light Duty Automotive Components, Heavy Duty Automotive Components, Printing Presses, Valves and Meters, and Industrial Automation. Rockwell International was a major employer in Southern California, northern Ohio, northern Georgia, eastern Oklahoma, Michigan, west Texas, Iowa, Illinois, Wisconsin, and western Pennsylvania.

Anderson stepped down as CEO in February 1988, leaving the company to president Donald R. Beall. The completion of the Space Shuttle program and the completion of the B-1 bomber program had led to a decline in revenues, and Beall sought to diversify the company away from government contracts. The end of the Cold War and the perceived "peace dividend", however, prompted accelerated divestitures and sweeping management reforms. From 1988 to 2001 the company moved its headquarters four times: from Pittsburgh, Pennsylvania where it had been for decades to El Segundo, California to Seal Beach, California to Costa Mesa, California to Milwaukee, Wisconsin.

At the end of the 1980s, the company sold its valve and meter division, formerly Rockwell Manufacturing, to British Tyre & Rubber. Although Rockwell was the #1 Defense and NASA contractor, the  "peace dividend" perceived after the fall of the Soviet bloc, led the company to sell its defense and aerospace business, including what was once North American Aviation, the Defense Electronics Division and Rocketdyne, to Boeing Integrated Defense Systems in December 1996. In the 1990s, the company spun off its semiconductor products as Conexant Technologies (CNXT), later bought by Synaptics in 2017. Rockwell International also spun off its two automotive divisions (light vehicles division and heavy vehicles division) as one publicly traded company, Meritor Automotive, based in Troy, Michigan, which then merged with Arvin Industries to form Arvin Meritor. That company is now known as Meritor, Inc. In 1996, Rockwell International sold Graphic Systems (formerly Miehle-Goss-Dexter), an Illinois-based newspaper and commercial printing press manufacturer, to its internal management team Stonington Partners as part of a new corporation for US$600 million.

In 2001, what remained of Rockwell International was split into two publicly traded companies, Rockwell Automation and Rockwell Collins, ending the run of what had once been a massive and diverse conglomerate. The split was structured so that Rockwell Automation was the legal successor of the old Rockwell International, while Rockwell Collins was the spin-off.

In the end, the result had been four spin-offs and three sales combined from Rockwell's nine divisions.

The various Rockwell companies list a large number of firsts in their histories, including the World War II-era P-51 Mustang fighter and the B-25 Mitchell bomber, and the Korean War-era F-86 Sabre fighter jet, as well as the Apollo spacecraft, the B-1 Lancer bomber, the Space Shuttle orbiter, and most of the Navstar Global Positioning System satellites.

Rocketdyne, which had been spun off by North American in 1955, was re-merged into Rockwell, and by that time produced most of the rocket engines used in the United States. Rockwell also purchased the Aero Design and Engineering Company from William and Rufus Travis Amis. Rockwell redesigned the company's Aero Commander aircraft, introducing its new design as the Rockwell Commander 112 and Commander 114.

The company developed a desktop calculator based on a MOSFET chip for use by its engineers. In 1967 Rockwell set up its own manufacturing plant to produce them, starting North American Rockwell MicroElectronics Corp. (called NARMEC). This would later become Rockwell Semiconductor. One of its major successes came in the early 1990s when it introduced the first low-cost 14.4 kbit/s modem chipset, which was used in a huge number of modems.

Collins radios were fitted to 80% of the airliners which were based in first-world countries. Collins designed and built the radios that communicated the Apollo moon landings and the high-frequency radio network that allows worldwide communication with U.S. military aircraft. Rockwell's Rocketdyne division designed and built the third stage of the Minuteman intercontinental ballistic missile, and the Advanced Inertial Reference Sphere inertial navigation system that provided its navigation. It also built inertial navigation systems for the fleet of ballistic missile submarines.

In addition to the manufacture of nuclear missiles and bombers, Rockwell also produced key components of the bombs they carried, including plutonium triggers at the Rocky Flats Plant in Colorado. Rockwell ran the weapons plant from 1975 to 1990, and was the one of the subjects of the investigation of Special Grand Jury 89-2 into mismanagement of the plant. In 1990, a group of Colorado homeowners filed a lawsuit against Rockwell and the Dow Chemical Company, accusing the operators of reducing the value of their properties as a result of plutonium releases from the plant. A $375 million settlement was reached in 2016.

Rockwell built heavy-duty truck axles and drive-trains in the U.S., along with power windows, seats, and locks. The Rockwell Tripmaster trip recording system for commercial vehicles was released along with the Logtrak module for DOT log recording for fleets who successfully petitioned the DOT for paper logbook exemptions. Rockwell also built yachts and business jets and owned large amounts of real estate.

It was also involved in providing custom electronic intelligence equipment to the Imperial Iranian Air Force as part of Project Ibex and paid bribes to the Shah of Iran in order to secure contracts there.

Products

Aircraft
 Fuji/Rockwell Commander 700
 North American Rockwell OV-10 Bronco
 North American Sabreliner
 Rockwell B-1 Lancer
 Rockwell Commander 112
 Rockwell Ranger 2000
 Rockwell X-30
 Rockwell XFV-12
 Rockwell-MBB X-31

Crewed spacecraft

 Apollo Command and Service Module (initially under North American Aviation, then North American Rockwell)
 Space Shuttle orbiter (initially under North American Rockwell)

Rocket propulsion (Rocketdyne division)
 H-1 (Saturn I, I-B)
 J-2 (Saturn I-B, V)
 F-1 (Saturn V)
 RS-25 (Space Shuttle)

For a more extensive list, see Rocketdyne engines.

Missiles
 AGM-53 Condor
 AGM-114 Hellfire

Unmanned aerial vehicles
 Rockwell HiMAT

Research laboratory
Rockwell International had a major research laboratory complex in Thousand Oaks, Ventura County, California. It was founded and built by North American Aviation in 1962, as the North American Science Center. In 1973 it became the Rockwell International Science Center.

The laboratory did independent contract research for the U.S. Government, and also provided research services for the company's business units. It was famous for its research in: advanced materials, particularly ceramics; for its infrared imagers; for its research in liquid-crystal displays; and for its high-speed electronics. The laboratory invented Metalorganic vapour-phase epitaxy (MOVPE), also commonly known as Metal Organic Chemical Vapor Deposition (MOCVD). It also achieved fame in selected areas of information science, notably human-computer interaction, augmented reality, multimedia systems, and diagnostics. Rockwell Science Center led the United States Army Research Laboratory's Advanced Displays Federated Laboratory Consortium in the late 1990s. In 2000, the infrared imaging division of the laboratory moved into a new building in Camarillo, California.

After Rockwell International's breakup in 2001, the laboratory was spun off as a semi-autonomous company called Rockwell Scientific, half owned by Rockwell Collins and half owned by Rockwell Automation. In 2006, the main laboratory and infrared imaging division were sold to Teledyne Corporation. Teledyne made the laboratory complex in Thousand Oaks into its corporate headquarters. A reduced but active research and development operation continues there, under the name Teledyne Scientific & Imaging, LLC.

See also

References

Further reading

Primary sources

External links

 Rockwell Automation
 Rockwell Collins
 North American Rockwell history on Boeing.com
 Rockwell International history on Boeing.com
 Boeing Australia's history of Rockwell International
 1987 article on longtime CEO retiring.

 
Aerospace companies of the United States
American companies established in 1973
American companies disestablished in 2001
Collier Trophy recipients
Companies based in Milwaukee
Companies based in Pittsburgh
Computer companies established in 1973
Computer companies disestablished in 2001
Defense companies of the United States
Defunct aircraft manufacturers of the United States
Defunct computer companies of the United States
Defunct computer hardware companies
Defunct manufacturing companies based in Greater Los Angeles
Defunct manufacturing companies based in Pennsylvania
Defunct manufacturing companies based in Wisconsin
Defunct technology companies of the United States
Manufacturing companies disestablished in 2001
Manufacturing companies established in 1973
North American Aviation
Printing press manufacturers
Rocket engine manufacturers of the United States
Rocketdyne
Superfund sites in California
Superfund sites in Michigan
Technology companies based in Greater Los Angeles
Technology companies disestablished in 2001
Technology companies established in 1973